Marina Severa (died before 375) was the Empress of Rome and first wife of Emperor Valentinian I. She was the mother of later Emperor Gratian. Her full name is unknown. Marina Severa is a combination of the two names given in primary sources. Socrates of Constantinople calls her "Severa" while John Malalas, the Chronicon Paschale and John of Nikiû name her "Marina".

Life

Marina Severa married Valentinian before he ascended to the throne. Their son, Gratian was born in 359 at Sirmium in Pannonia. Valentinian was chosen emperor in 364. He divorced his wife around 370 to marry Justina, widow of usurper Magnentius.

According to Socrates of Constantinople: 

This account was dismissed by later historians whose interpretation of it was an unlikely legalization of bigamy. However Timothy Barnes and others consider this decision to only allow various Romans to divorce and then remarry. The controversy being that Christianity had yet to accept the concept of a divorce. Barnes considers that Valentinian was willing to go forth with the legal reformation in pursuit of dynastic legitimacy that would secure his presence on the throne.

John Malalas, the Chronicon Paschale and John of Nikiû report Severa to have been banished because of involvement in an illegal transaction. Barnes considers this story to be an attempt to justify the divorce of Valentinian I without blaming the emperor.  According to the account of John of Nikiû: 

When Valentinian died in 375, he was buried in the Church of the Holy Apostles in Constantinople, next to his first wife.

References

Sources

External links
Section about her in "Ammianus Marcellinus and the Representation of Historical Reality" by Timothy David Barnes

Valentinianic dynasty
4th-century deaths
4th-century Christians
4th-century Roman empresses
Burials at the Church of the Holy Apostles
Year of birth unknown